The 1997 Northeast Conference baseball tournament was held in May 1997 at Skylands Park in Sussex, New Jersey.  The league's top four teams competed in the double elimination tournament.  Top-seeded  won their first and only tournament championship then won the NCAA play-in series against Siena to advance to the 1997 NCAA Division I baseball tournament.

Seeding and format
The top four finishers were seeded one through four based on conference regular-season winning percentage.  They played a double-elimination tournament.

Bracket

Most Valuable Player
Ben Shove of Marist was named Tournament Most Valuable Player.

References

Tournament
Northeast Conference Baseball Tournament
Northeast Conference baseball tournament
Northeast Conference baseball tournament